Tom Clancy's Ghost Recon Predator is a tactical shooter video game developed by Virtuos, published by Ubisoft for the PlayStation Portable, and released in 2010.

Gameplay
In Predator, players control a squad of 3 Ghost special forces soldiers (from a selection of 8 possible characters from 5 different classes including scout, support gunner, marksman, shotgunner, and medic) to hunt terrorists in jungles and bases in Sri Lanka. The gameplay and user interface are heavily based on that of the Xbox 360 version of Ghost Recon Advanced Warfighter and the console versions of Ghost Recon Advanced Warfighter 2, being a third-person cover-based shooter with a focus on tactical squad orders. Unlike Ghost Recon 2 or Ghost Recon: Advanced Warfighter, the player is able to dynamically switch between control of all 3 of their Ghost squad mates, instead of only controlling a single main character.

Plot
After the crew of several U.S. mining vessels off the coast of Sri Lanka are massacred by unknown assailants, a team of Ghost special forces soldiers led by Colonel Scott Mitchell are covertly sent into Sri Lanka to deal with the situation. On the ground in Sri Lanka, the Ghosts are assisted by Mister Hisan and the Mumpuri Guard, a non-political group formed to protect the civilian population from various armed factions that are currently fighting for control of the country.

The Ghosts receive intelligence from the C.I.A. identifying one of the armed groups, the People's Action Front (also known as the Activists) as being responsible for the massacre of the U.S. ship crews. The Ghosts take out several Activist bases and eventually assassinate their leader, "The Teacher". However, once the Teacher is dead, the Ghosts are ambushed by a much better equipped and more paramilitary-style faction known as the Loyalists. After being rescued by the Mumpuri Guard, the Ghosts engage in activities against the Loyalists, including rescuing Colonel Mitchell after his helicopter is shot down by them.

The Ghosts eventually learn that the C.I.A.'s informant in Sri Lanka, Dilip Khan, is a member of the Loyalists and gave the U.S. false information implicating the Teacher in the attacks on U.S. ships. The attacks were actually conducted by the Loyalists as a false flag operation to trick the U.S. into assassinating the Teacher, so that the Activist faction could be absorbed into the Loyalist faction. The Ghosts capture Khan and force him to make a confession, causing the Activists and Loyalists to go to war with each other. Using the fighting as cover, the Ghosts infiltrate a Loyalist headquarters to rescue the President of Sri Lanka, who has been kidnapped by them. They also discover a Loyalist propaganda broadcast that reveals the leader of the Loyalists is Sunil Ranga, the Minister of Energy.

The Ghosts infiltrate Ranga's mansion estate, where Ranga is either killed or captured, bringing an end to the hostilities. They are thanked by Mister Hisan for their actions, and inform him that "they were never here."

Setting and adaptation
The game is loosely based on the Second JVP insurrection, where Sri Lanka encountered the 'Anti-americanist' Janatha Vimukthi Peramuna, The group known as the 'People's Action Front' is a close reference to the group, People's Liberation Front of Sri Lanka. The loyalists are loosely representing the Patriotic People's Front.

Reception

The game was met with mixed reception upon release; GameRankings gave it a score of 56%, while Metacritic gave it 54 out of 100.

References

External links

2010 video games
PlayStation Portable games
PlayStation Portable-only games
Sri Lankan Civil War in video games
Tom Clancy games
Tom Clancy's Ghost Recon games
Ubisoft games
Video games developed in China
Video games set in Sri Lanka
Virtuos games
Single-player video games